Hamad Nazzal is a journalist, author, and the editor of the Arab Washingtonian newspaper. He is also known for his collection of short stories, A'art - Boast, and his poetry translations published in Al-Quds and al-bayader.

Biography
In 1989, Nazzal founded an Amnesty International group in Jordan and was elected a member of the executive committee of the Jordan branch of the organization. He was also the Director of Jordan Cultural Forum. Nazzal received a B.A. in Literature in 1991 and M.Phil. from Glasgow University in 1997.

He has worked for Al Ahali newspaper, Shihan, al-Jamaheer (Jordan), The Gulf Today, Al Khaleej, and the UAE Air Force Magazine. In addition, he is a former writer at Radio Sawa, Jamestown Foundation, and Magharebia (United States).

Political views
Nazzal is a critic of totalitarian Arab regimes; the tribal-based Arab social system and corruption; the US foreign policy in the Middle East; and the fundamental Islamic movements in the region. Democracy, in his view, is the only path towards development and progress. He has argued that the current popularity of Islamist organizations in the Middle East is temporary as the public mood in the region is historically moderate. The past fifty years of Arab dictatorships had produced massive state failure which led to increasing the support of traditional forces (religious groups) who were powerless in the region from 1900 to 1990.

Nazzal opposes wars and has called for an end to the US military intervention in Iraq. He also has urged the US to negotiate with military groups in Iraq to stop the civil war and to achieve an urgently needed cease fire.

He believes in reforming Islam and the separation between state and religion. In an article entitled: The USA and Israel: Who rules who? Nazzal dismissed the notion that the Jewish minority controls US policies. Although he believes in a strong Jewish influence in America, he thinks the final say in these policies is on the hands of the White Anglo-Saxon Protestant "White Establishment". Nazzal has urged the US administrations to use their influence with the Jewish State and force Israel to accept a fair and just settlement to the Middle East conflict.

References

http://www.ammonnews.net/article.aspx?articleNO=69563

https://web.archive.org/web/20110927060859/http://www.ahram.org.eg/Books/News/43271.aspx

American male journalists
Living people
Year of birth missing (living people)